Karel Domin (4 May 1882, Kutná Hora, Kingdom of Bohemia – 10 June 1953, Prague) was a Czech botanist and politician.

After gymnasium school studies in Příbram, he studied botany at the Charles University in Prague, and graduated in 1906. Between 1911 and 1913 he published several important articles on Australian taxonomy. In 1916 he was named as professor of botany. Domin specialised in phytogeography, geobotany and plant taxonomy. He became a member at the Czechoslovak Academy of Sciences, published many scientific works and founded a botany institute at the university. The Domin scale, a commonly used means of classifying a standard area by the number of plant species found in that area, is named after him.

In the academic year 1933-34 he was rector of Charles University and was one of the participants of a struggle for ancient academic insignia between the Czech and German universities of Prague (the insigniáda) that resulted in street-fights and looting. From 1935 to 1939 he was a member of parliament; after the Munich Agreement, he co-founded a traditionalist political movement (Akce národní obrody).

He is considered the man who is the most responsible the creation of Tatra National Park.

References

External links
 Short biography (in Czech)

1882 births
1953 deaths
People from Kutná Hora
People from the Kingdom of Bohemia
Czechoslovak National Democracy politicians
Party of National Unity (Czechoslovakia) politicians
Members of the Chamber of Deputies of Czechoslovakia (1935–1939)
Czech botanists
Czech politicians
Czechoslovak fascists
Academic staff of Charles University
Charles University alumni
Burials at Vyšehrad Cemetery